The 2017–18 Scottish Premiership (known as the Ladbrokes Premiership for sponsorship reasons) was the fifth season of the Scottish Premiership, the highest division of Scottish football. The fixtures were published on 23 June 2017. The season began on 5 August 2017. Celtic were the defending champions.

Twelve teams contested the league: Aberdeen, Celtic, Dundee, Hamilton Academical, Heart of Midlothian, Hibernian, Kilmarnock, Motherwell, Partick Thistle, Rangers, Ross County and St Johnstone.

The season's average attendance was 15,932, the highest level since 2006–07.

On 29 April 2018, Celtic won their seventh consecutive title and 49th overall after a 5–0 win at home to Rangers.

Teams
The following teams have changed division since the 2016–17 season.

To Premiership
Promoted from Scottish Championship
 Hibernian

From Premiership
Relegated to Scottish Championship
 Inverness Caledonian Thistle

Stadia and locations

Personnel and kits

Managerial changes

Format

Basic
In the initial phase of the season, the 12 teams will play a round-robin tournament whereby each team plays each one of the other teams three times. After 33 games, the league splits into two sections of six teams, with each team playing each other in that section. The league attempts to balance the fixture list so that teams in the same section play each other twice at home and twice away, but sometimes this is impossible. A total of 228 matches will be played, with 38 matches played by each team.

Prize money
In April 2018, the SPFL confirmed the prize money to be allocated to the league members at the conclusion of the competitions. The Premiership winners would receive £3.176 million, with a total pot of £24.5m to be distributed across the four divisions.

League summary

League table

Positions by round
The table lists the positions of teams after each week of matches. In order to preserve chronological progress, any postponed matches are not included in the round at which they were originally scheduled, but added to the full round they were played immediately afterwards. For example, if a match is scheduled for matchday 13, but then postponed and played between days 16 and 17, it will be added to the standings for day 16.
 

 

 
Source: BBC Sport

Results

Matches 1–22
Teams play each other twice, once at home and once away.

Matches 23–33
Teams play every other team once (either at home or away).

Matches 34–38
After 33 matches, the league splits into two sections of six teams i.e. the top six and the bottom six, with the teams playing every other team in their section once (either at home or away). The exact matches are determined by the position of the teams in the league table at the time of the split.

Top six

Bottom six

Season statistics

Top scorers

Hat-tricks

Discipline

Player

Yellow cards

Red cards

Club

Yellow cards

Red cards

Attendances
These are the average attendances of the teams.

Awards

Premiership play-offs
The quarter-final will be contested between the third and fourth-placed teams (Dundee United and Dunfermline Athletic) in the Scottish Championship, with the winners advancing to the semi-final to face the second-placed Championship side (Livingston). The last remaining Championship team will play-off against the eleventh-placed Premiership team in the final, with the winners securing the last place in the 2018–19 Scottish Premiership.

Quarter-final

First leg

Second leg

Semi-final

First leg

Second leg

Final

First leg

Second leg

Livingston were promoted to the Premiership.

Broadcasting

Live Matches 
The SPFL permits Sky Sports and BT Sport to show up to six live home matches between the broadcasters from each club - although this is only four for Rangers and Celtic. Sky Sports and BT Sport's deal allows them to broadcast 30 games each (and the play-offs for BT). The deal roughly provides £21m to SPFL per season.

Highlights 
Sky Sports hold the rights to Saturday night highlights - however, they do not broadcast a dedicated programme and instead merely show the goals of the Premiership matches on Sky Sports News in their Goals Express programme - which primarily is focused on goals from the English Football League. Gaelic-language channel BBC Alba has the rights to broadcast the repeat in full of 38 Saturday 3pm matches "as live" at 5.30pm. The main Premiership highlights programme is BBC Scotland's Sportscene programme hosted on a Sunday which shows in depth highlights of all six Premiership matches every weekend. STV show the goals the weekend matches on Monday nights during the Sport section of their News at Six programme as well as during their weeknight football-debate show on STV2. The SPFL also uploads the goals from every Premiership match onto its YouTube channel - available from 6pm on a Sunday for UK and Ireland viewers and 10pm on a Saturday for those worldwide.

See also
Nine in a row

References

External links
Official website 

Scottish Premiership seasons
1
1
Scot